Senator Bowman may refer to:

Bill Bowman (American politician) (born 1946), North Dakota State Senate
Edwin Bowman (born 1946), West Virginia State Senate
John Bowman (New York politician) (1782–1853), New York State Senate
Jonathan Bowman (1828–1895), Wisconsin State Senate
Peter Bowman (born 1937), Maine State Senate
Selwyn Z. Bowman (1840–1928), Massachusetts State Senate
Tod Bowman (born 1965), Iowa State Senate